Seth Helgeson (born October 8, 1990) is an American professional ice hockey defenseman who is currently playing for the Bridgeport Islanders of the American Hockey League (AHL). Helgeson was selected by the New Jersey Devils in the 4th round (114th overall) of the 2009 NHL Entry Draft.

Playing career

Amateur
After completing two seasons at Faribault High, Helgeson attended the 2007 Sioux City Musketeers of the USHL  training camp. He subsequently joined the team for their 2007–08 season. On November 19, 2008, Helgeson committed to play NCAA Division I hockey with the Minnesota Golden Gophers men's ice hockey team. While playing with the Sioux City Musketeers, Helgeson was selected for the 2009 USHL All-Star Game.

In his freshman season with the Minnesota Golden Gophers, Helgeson played in 31 games and recorded one goal. His only goal came during the 2010 WCHA playoffs against North Dakota and was the game winning goal to tie the teams in the series. North Dakota ended up winning the series 2–1. He was awarded the Donald M. Clark Community Service award by the Gophers at the conclusion of the season.

In his sophomore season, Helgeson played in 36 games and recorded a new career high seven points. He was again awarded the Donald M. Clark Community Service award at the conclusion of the season.

In his junior year, Helgeson recorded an uptake in scoring and set new career highs in goals, assists, and points. He was also named to the All-WCHA Academic Team.

During the 2012–13 season, Helgeson was the sole senior on the team and served as an alternate captain. At the end of the season, he had played in 121 consecutive games for the Gophers and led the team in penalty minutes. He was also named to the All-WCHA Academic Team for the second time.

Professional
On April 5, 2013, the Albany Devils of the American Hockey League (AHL) signed Helgeson to an amateur tryout agreement, allowing the defenseman to suit up with the AHL team for their final four games of the 2012–13 season.

On November 27, 2013, the New Jersey Devils of the NHL recalled Helgeson from the Albany Devils, under emergency conditions, however it turned out he was not needed and was returned to Albany after the morning skate.

After a strong training camp with the Devils for the 2014–15 season, Helgeson was recalled by New Jersey from Albany on November 11, 2014 to replace the injured Bryce Salvador, and immediately made his NHL debut, registering an assist in a 3–1 victory over the Minnesota Wild.

On July 1, 2017, having left the Devils as a free agent, Helgeson signed with cross-town rivals the New York Islanders on a one-year, two-way contract. On October 7, he was named an alternate captain for the Bridgeport Sound Tigers, the Islanders AHL affiliate.

On July 2, 2018, Helgeson stayed with the Islanders organization and signed a two-year, two-way contract.

After three seasons with the Sound Tigers, Helgeson as a free agent from the Islanders, opted to continue his tenure within the organization by signing a one-year AHL contract with the Sound Tigers on October 29, 2020.

Career statistics

Awards and honors

References

External links
 

1990 births
Living people
Albany Devils players
American men's ice hockey defensemen
Bridgeport Islanders players
Bridgeport Sound Tigers players
Ice hockey players from Minnesota
Minnesota Golden Gophers men's ice hockey players
New Jersey Devils draft picks
New Jersey Devils players
People from Faribault, Minnesota
Sioux City Musketeers players